Lorena Uslé Vejo (born 16 February 1994) is a Spanish badminton player. Trained at the Oviedo badminton club, she won three mixed doubles title at the Spanish National Championships partnered with Alberto Zapico. She was part of Spanish team that won the bronze medal at the 2016 and 2018 European Women's Team Championships.

Career 
Uslé started to playing badminton at the age of 8 in Cantabria. At 16, she received an internship scholarship at the Technification Center of Asturias, in Oviedo, where she is currently training.

She competed at the 2018 Mediterranean Games and 2019 European Games.

Achievements

BWF International Challenge/Series (3 runners-up) 
Women's doubles

Mixed doubles

  BWF International Challenge tournament
  BWF International Series tournament
  BWF Future Series tournament

BWF Junior International (1 title) 
Girls' doubles

  BWF Junior International Grand Prix tournament
  BWF Junior International Challenge tournament
  BWF Junior International Series tournament
  BWF Junior Future Series tournament

References

External links 

 

1994 births
Living people
People from Cantabria
Sportspeople from Oviedo
Spanish female badminton players
Badminton players at the 2019 European Games
European Games competitors for Spain
Competitors at the 2018 Mediterranean Games
Mediterranean Games competitors for Spain
21st-century Spanish women